August Friedrich Böttcher (5 October 1825 – 20 November 1900) was a German entomologist.
 
He was born in Berlin, where he became an insect dealer.

References
Anonym 1900 [Bottcher, A. F.] Insektenbörse, Stuttgart 17  385, Portrait
Anonym 1900 [Bottcher, A. F.]  Soc. ent., Zürich 15[1900-1901]
 Groll, E. K. (Hrsg.): Biografien der Entomologen der Welt : Datenbank. Version 4.15 : Senckenberg Deutsches Entomologisches Institut, 2010  Portrait photographs

German entomologists
Scientists from Berlin
1825 births
1900 deaths